Eternal Search (1978–2007) was a Canadian Champion Thoroughbred racehorse foaled in Ontario.

Purchased at age two for $50,000 by Mel Lawson who raced her under his Jim Dandy Stable banner, she was trained by Canadian Horse Racing Hall of Fame inductee, Ted Mann. The winner of numerous stakes races on both dirt and turf from age two through five, Eternal Search was voted a Sovereign Award as the Canadian Champion Sprinter for 1981 and twice as Canadian Campion Older Mare in 1982 and 1983.

Afflicted with cancer, Eternal Search was euthanized at age twenty-nine in late June 2007 at Curraghmore Farm near Waterdown, Ontario.

References
 Eternal Search's pedigree and partial racing stats

1978 racehorse births
2007 racehorse deaths
Racehorses bred in Ontario
Racehorses trained in Canada
Sovereign Award winners
Thoroughbred family 3-g